Austenitic stainless steel is one of the five classes of stainless steel by crystalline structure (along with ferritic, martensitic, duplex and precipitation hardened). Its primary crystalline structure is austenite (face-centered cubic) and it prevents steels from being hardenable by heat treatment and makes them essentially non-magnetic. This structure is achieved by adding enough austenite-stabilizing elements such as nickel, manganese and nitrogen. The Incoloy family of alloys belong to the category of super austenitic stainless steels.

AISI 200 and 300 series
There are two subgroups of austenitic stainless steel. 300 series stainless steels achieve their austenitic structure primarily by a nickel addition while 200 series stainless steels substitute manganese and nitrogen for nickel, though there is still a small nickel content. 

300 series stainless steels are the larger subgroup. The most common austenitic stainless steel and most common of all stainless steel is Type 304, also known as 18/8 or A2. Type 304 is extensively used in such items as cookware, cutlery, and kitchen equipment. Type 316 is the next most common austenitic stainless steel. Some 300 series, such as Type 316, also contain some molybdenum to promote resistance to acids and increase resistance to localized attack (e.g. pitting and crevice corrosion).

The higher nitrogen addition in 200 series gives them higher mechanical strength than 300 series.

Alloy 20 (Carpenter 20) is an austenitic stainless steel possessing excellent resistance to hot sulfuric acid and many other aggressive environments which would readily attack type 316 stainless. This alloy exhibits superior resistance to stress-corrosion cracking in boiling 20–40% sulfuric acid. Alloy 20 has excellent mechanical properties and the presence of niobium in the alloy minimizes the precipitation of carbides during welding.

Heat resisting austenitic stainless steels 
Heat resisting grades can be used at elevated temperatures, usually above .

They must resist corrosion (usually oxidation) and retain mechanical properties, mostly strength (yield stress) and creep resistance

Corrosion resistance is mostly provided by chromium, with additions of silicon and aluminium.  Nickel does not resist well in sulphur containing environments. This is usually taken care of by adding more Si and Al which form very stable oxides. Rare earth elements such as cerium increase the stability of the oxide film.

Note: ferritic stainless steels do not retain strength at elevated temperatures and are not used when strength is required.

Austenitic stainless steel can be tested by nondestructive testing using the dye penetrant inspection method but not the magnetic particle inspection method. Eddy-current testing may also be used.

Precipitation Hardening grade EN1.4980  
Grade EN1.4980 (also known as A286) is not considered strictly as a heat resisting steel in standards, but this is popular grade for its combination of strength and corrosion resistance.

 Aerospace (standardized in AMS5731, AMS5732, AMS5737 and AMS5525 standards), 
 Industrial gas turbines, 
 Automotive (turbo parts), etc.

See also
 Martensitic stainless steel
 Duplex stainless steel
 Ferritic stainless steel
 Stainless steel

References

External links
Austenitic stainless steels Jean H. Decroix et al.

Stainless steel